Walter Davis Dabney (May 13, 1853 – March 12, 1899) was an American attorney, law professor, and politician who served in the Virginia House of Delegates.

References

External links 

1853 births
1899 deaths
Democratic Party members of the Virginia House of Delegates
19th-century American politicians